After a disappointing 21st placing in the 2001 contest, Ireland was relegated from the 2002 contest. For the 2003 contest in Riga, Ireland abandoned the "National Song Contest" format, and set up a reality show called You're a Star. The winner was Mickey Joe Harte, with the song "We've Got the World".

Before Eurovision

You're a Star 

You're a Star was the national final developed by the RTÉ in order to select the Irish entry for the Eurovision Song Contest 2003. Created by Screentime ShinAwiL and Raidió Teilifís Éireann (RTÉ) in 2002, it was shown weekly on RTÉ One over the winter months 2002. The show was broadcast live from The Helix theatre in Dublin City University (DCU). The Talent spotter, Phil Coulter and Kerry Katona served as judges.

Final 
The final was held on 8 March 2003, hosted by Ray D'arcy. The last 4 singers in the "You're a Star" contest each sang a potential ESC entry starting on 23 February 2003, with the public eliminating one every week by televoting. The winner was announced on 9 March 2003.

At Eurovision 
At the contest, Harte performed 3rd on the night following Austria and preceding Turkey. Ireland received 53 points at the close of voting and tied for 11th place with Germany, guaranteeing Ireland a place in the final of the 2004 contest.

Voting

Delayed televoting results 
Televoting was provided to viewers in Ireland during the contest, however due to a delay in receiving the full results the votes of an assembled back-up jury were used instead to provide the Irish votes. RTÉ subsequently revealed the top 10 countries from the Irish televoting after the contest.

References

External links
 Irish National Final page

2003
Countries in the Eurovision Song Contest 2003
Eurovision
Eurovision